Lindsay Varty (born 8 June 1988) is a Hong Kong rugby union player. She competed at the 2017 Women's Rugby World Cup, it was Hong Kong's first appearance in a World Cup.

Biography 
Varty is of English and Macanese descent. She began playing rugby at the age of 12. She first joined Hong Kong's sevens team at 17 and was a mainstay for 13 years. Her older brother, Rowan, has also represented Hong Kong internationally in fifteens and sevens.

References 

1988 births
Living people
Hong Kong people
Hong Kong rugby union players
Hong Kong female rugby union players
Hong Kong female rugby sevens players
Rugby union players at the 2010 Asian Games
Rugby union players at the 2014 Asian Games